Havelian railway station is located in Havelian, Khyber Pakhtunkhwa, Pakistan.

See also
 List of railway stations in Pakistan
 Pakistan Railways

References

External links

Railway stations in Abbottabad District